The 15th Orgburo of the All-Union Communist Party (Bolsheviks) was elected by the 1st Plenary Session of the  15th Central Committee, in the immediate aftermath of the 15th Congress.

Full members

Candidate members

References

Members of the Orgburo of the Central Committee of the Communist Party of the Soviet Union
1927 establishments in the Soviet Union
1930 disestablishments in the Soviet Union